Choristoneura jecorana is a species of moth of the family Tortricidae. It is found in Iran.

References

Moths described in 1899
Choristoneura